HMS Attack was launched in 1794 as a Conquest-class gunvessel for the Royal Navy. She had an uneventful career and the Navy sold her in 1802.

Career
Lieutenant Thomas Eyre Hinton commissioned Attack in February 1795. In 1795 she served in Sir Sidney Smith's inshore squadron.

Between July and October 1796 Attack was at Portsmouth being coppered and receiving sliding keels.

Lieutenant Joseph James took command in 1798. Attack spent 1799 escorting convoys in the Channel. In April she recaptured William, Rowell, master, which had been sailing from Newry to London when a French privateer had captured her.

On 14 August 1800, Attack sent into Plymouth Christian, Odding, master, which had been sailing from Bordeaux to Hamburg.

Fate
Attack was paid off in 1801. She was sold at Sheerness in September 1802.

Crew
John Toup Nicolas began his naval career on Attack.

Citations and references
Citations

References
 

1794 ships
Brigs of the Royal Navy